Heroes of Steel is a supplement to the 2nd edition of the Advanced Dungeons & Dragons fantasy role-playing game.

Contents
Heroes of Steel is the first boxed expansion for the Dragonlance: Fifth Age campaign world and, like the main boxed set, it comprises two A5 books and a colorful map. Book one expands on the Fifth Age rules by presenting guidelines on complicated actions. Book two, The Rising Storm, is part one of a series of adventures, called Dragons of a New Age, that take place concurrently with the first series of Fifth Age novels.

Publication history
Heroes of Steel was published by TSR, Inc. in 1996.

Reception
David Comford reviewed Heroes of Steel for Arcane magazine, rating it a 7 out of 10 overall. He commented that in the first book, "Shortcuts through unfamiliar territory, charging into combat, shield slamming an opponent and group activities can all be found. New weapons tables are included and both these and the rules are simple to grasp. Continuing with the focus on roleplaying over rules, book one includes bonus and penalty modifiers to inflict on your group should anyone not act in character." He continued, "However, Heroes is mainly a warriors sourcebook, and the first book delves into the roles available for fighters including the knightly orders of Takhisis, Solamnia and The Legion. Advantages and disadvantages accompany each, and all are highly playable." Comford concluded the review by saying, "The adventure is well planned, easily played and exciting, but it's over far too soon and should have been developed into a detailed campaign."

Reviews
Backstab (Issue 2 - Mar/Apr 1997)

References

Dragonlance supplements
Role-playing game supplements introduced in 1996